Remembering Arthur is a documentary about collage filmmaker Arthur Lipsett that debuted at the 2006 Toronto International Film Festival. It is directed by Lipsett's close friend Martin Lavut and takes a personal approach to the story of his life through interviews with family, friends and colleagues.  The film was produced by Public Pictures in association with the National Film Board of Canada, Bravo! and TVOntario.

In 2007 it won the "Best Cinematography in a Documentary" Award from The Canadian Society of Cinematographers.

External links 

 Public Pictures
 Watch Remembering Arthur at the National Film Board of Canada

2006 films
English-language Canadian films
Canadian documentary films
Documentary films about film directors and producers
National Film Board of Canada documentaries
2006 documentary films
Documentary films about the cinema of Canada
Films directed by Martin Lavut
2000s English-language films
2000s Canadian films